Milton is a city in and the county seat of Santa Rosa County, Florida, located in the Pensacola–Ferry Pass–Brent Metropolitan Statistical Area, also known as the Pensacola Metropolitan Area. Milton is located in the geographic center of Santa Rosa County, it is bordered by Pace to the west, and Navarre to the South. As of April 1, 2020, the population of Milton was 10,197.

The town was incorporated in 1844 and is home to Naval Air Station Whiting Field.

Milton is part of the Pensacola–Ferry Pass–Brent Metropolitan Statistical Area.

Etymology

Milton was known by various names during its development. Most notable were "Hell-Town" (muggy, inhospitable land covered with briars, mosquitoes, thorns, snakes) "Jernigan's Landing", "Scratch Ankle" (due to the briars that grew along the riverbank), and "Hard Scrabble."

According to Florida historian Allen Morris, "Just which Milton was honored by the final name is a dispute.  Some say it is a contraction of an earlier Milltown; others that it was Milton Amos, pioneer and ancestor of the present Amos family; still others that it was John Milton—not the English poet, but the Civil War governor of Florida."

History

Milton was settled in the early 1800s as a small village centered on the lumber industry. The settlement originally was known as Scratch Ankle because of the briars and bramble that grew in the area. Another name was Jernigan's Landing after Benjamin Jernigan (died April 1847), who built a water-powered saw mill at what is now Locklin Lake between 1828 and 1830. Other names were Lumberton, Black Water, and Hard Scrabble, but by 1839, it was being referred to as Milltown. Milton was incorporated as a town in 1844, one year before the Territory of Florida joined the United States as the 27th state.

During the Civil War, much of Milton was burned by Confederate forces retreating from the Union capture of Pensacola in May 2-4 of 1862. The Confederates intended to prevent the town's industries from falling into Union hands. After the Southern forces evacuated the Union troops had a small garrison in nearby Bagdad where they had a base for expeditions in the surrounding area. Many Milton residents fled to Alabama.

Naval Air Station Whiting Field was constructed during World War II with the help of many German prisoners of war who were housed in a camp on the site. The station was commissioned on July 16, 1943, by Rear Admiral George D. Murray and the widow of Captain Kenneth Whiting, after whom the station was named.

On March 31, 1962, an F3 tornado hit the northwest side of Milton, causing 17 deaths and 100 injuries. It was Florida's deadliest tornado until February 22, 1998 when 25 people were killed in Kissimmee by another F3 tornado. It was also the deadliest tornado in 1962.

Geography

Climate

Demographics

At the 2000 census, there were 7,045 people, 2,674 households and 1,831 families residing in the town. The racial makeup of the town was 67.84% White, 25.95% African American, 0.71% Native American, 1.73% Asian, 0.17% Pacific Islander, 1.04% from other races, and 2.56% from two or more races. Hispanic or Latino of any race were 3.45% of the population.

There were 2,674 households, of which 33.9% had children under the age of 18 living with them, 49.7% were married couples living together, 15.6% had a female homeowner, and 31.5% were non-families. 27.2% of all households were made up of individuals, and 12.0% had someone living alone who was 65 years of age or older. The average household size was 2.51 and the average family size was 3.04.

27.3% of the population were under the age of 18, 8.9% from 18 to 24, 28.2% from 25 to 44, 18.8% from 45 to 64, and 16.8% who were 65 years of age or older. The median age was 34 years. For every 100 females, there were 86.2 males. For every 100 females age 18 and over, there were 81.1 males.

The median household income was $37,629, and the median family income was $44,261. Males had a median income of $35,000 versus $28,337 for females. The per capita income for the city was $19,367. About 11% of families and 16.7% of the population were below the poverty line, including 20.2% of those under age 18 and 11.7% of those age 65 or over.

City information

Santa Rosa Medical Center (SRMC) is a 129-bed general hospital in Milton. SRMC is the primary provider of hospital-based healthcare services and emergency medicine in Santa Rosa County.

Milton is the home of the West Florida Railroad Museum and the historic Imogene Theater, owned and operated by the Santa Rosa Historical Society.

Notable people

 Dan Amos, cofounder of Aflac
 Mark Everett, professional sprinter, 1997 world indoor champion; born in Milton and graduated from Milton High School in 1986
 Greg Evers, Florida legislator and farmer
 Daniel Ewing, professional basketball player, NBA and Maccabi Ashdod of Israeli Premier League
 Cortland Finnegan, NFL cornerback for Tennessee Titans, St. Louis Rams, Miami Dolphins and Carolina Panthers; graduated from Milton High School in 2002
 Dayton Hobbs, founder and pastor of independent Bible church in Milton, putative creator of tee-ball
 Bolley Johnson, member of Florida House of Representatives 1978–1994, speaker 1992–1994
 Reggie Slack, quarterback of National Football League and Canadian Football League; graduated from Milton High School in 1986
 Heath Slocum, professional golfer on PGA Tour; graduated from Milton High School in 1992
 Kevin Stitt, governor of Oklahoma; Tulsa-based businessman 
 Lawrence Tynes, NFL placekicker for Kansas City Chiefs, New York Giants and Tampa Bay Buccaneers; graduated from Milton High School in 1996
 Casper Van Dien, actor, star of films such as Starship Troopers and Sleepy Hollow; born in Milton
 Rod Walker, NFL defensive tackle for 3 years with the Green Bay Packers; born in Milton and graduated from Milton High School
 Boo Weekley, professional golfer on PGA Tour; born in Milton and graduated from Milton High School in 1992
 Elijah Williams, NFL cornerback for Atlanta Falcons; born in Milton and graduated from Milton High School in 1993
 Bubba Watson, professional golfer on PGA Tour, two time Masters champion; graduated from Milton High School in 1992

References

External links

 City of Milton
 The West Florida Railroad Museum
 Santa Rosa Press Gazette newspaper that serves Milton, Florida available in full-text with images in Florida Digital Newspaper Library
 The Milton Chronicle provides analysis of issues relating to Milton, Florida.

County seats in Florida
Cities in Pensacola metropolitan area
Cities in Santa Rosa County, Florida
Cities in Florida
1844 establishments in Florida Territory
Populated places established in 1844